Muqeible Airfield is an abandoned military airfield located in the northern West Bank, approximately 1 km southwest of the village of Muqeible, Israel and 3 km north of Jenin, Palestine.

The airfield was built in 1917 in the Ottoman District of Jerusalem (Ottoman Palestine) by the German Luftstreitkräfte. In 1918, after the Battle of Megiddo, the airport was used as a military airfield by the Royal Air Force, being designated RAF Muqeible. In July 1941 12 Blemheims of 45 Squadron were sent there for use as a forward base for the assault on Beirut. It was also used by the United States Army Air Force during the World War II North African Campaign. USAAF Ninth Air Force units were assigned to the airfield upon their initial arrival in the area, and once assembled were reassigned to combat airfields in Egypt to fly missions against the Axis forces in Western Egypt and Libya. Known USAAF units which used the airfield were:

 57th Fighter Group, 20 July – 15 September 1942, P-40 Warhawk
 64th Fighter Squadron, 19 August – 16 September 1942
 65th Fighter Squadron, 29 July – 5 August 1942; 29 August – 16 September 1942

After the war, the airfield appears to have been abandoned. Today, the airfield consists of two crumbling concrete runways, one aligned northeast–southwest about 02/20, the other east–west 09/27. The east–west still remaining full width and length, with a road laid down over the runway. Agricultural fields have been formed from the grassy areas of the airfield but no structures remain of the support base. Small concrete farm roads in the vicinity of the airfield runways are the remainders of taxiways.

References

 Maurer, Maurer. Air Force Combat Units of World War II. Maxwell AFB, Alabama: Office of Air Force History, 1983. .

External links

Defunct airports
Airfields of the United States Army Air Forces
Airports in the West Bank
Buildings and structures in Jenin
World War II airfields in Mandatory Palestine
1917 establishments in Ottoman Syria